(born in Tokyo City, Japan) is a Japanese poet, artist. She has published "AR poems" using augmented reality technology, "monitor poems" filled with emoji, and other genre-crossing works to widespread acclaim. One of her AR poems, "Best 100 Cultural Energies to Generate Power in 2012 Japan!!!!!" was selected as part of the DOMMUNE Official Guidebook 2. She won M/F prize when the 3331 art fair was on show in 2014.

Work
ni_ka took arrangement of the objects on the platform at the one-year memorial service for the 2011 Tohoku earthquake and tsunami to be an extension of concrete poetry, reacting with her "Manifesto on Updating Japanese Concrete Poetry." This inventor and practitioner "monitor poetry" and "AR poetry" states: unless I discover words, somehow absorb, collect and aggregate within wata-shi [a first person pronoun of her own invention that combines watashi, meaning "I" or "me," with shi, "poem" or "poetry"] all that hangs in suspension around words, and attend these words as they emerge, this would constitute not poetry but death." In this point of view, "words" would entail a new arrangement of things, which may express the disorderly relationship between the living and the dead. Poetry then becomes an endeavor to glean this relationship from the world, and rearrenging it in the same world in the form of a condensed logic (or as its vehicle).

Dommune Official Guide Book 2 selected her AR poetry as one of one hundred resources for the 2012 Japanese Cultural Energy. 2011 Tōhoku earthquake and tsunami inspired her to create a new form of mourning and a trans-generic form of living in which the boundary between language and image is deconstructed. In October 2013 ni_ka attended "Shibu-karu-sai" (Shibuya Cultural Festival), celebrating the 40th anniversary of Shibuya Seibu Department Store's PARCO Museum. In October 2014 ni_ka collaborated with an idol unit "Kamen-Joshi" (Masque Girls) at the exhibition After 3.11 Tokyo Girl in Ginza.

AR poetry is one of the original works of her that we could see a lot of pictures such as Hello Kitty, the roses, and morning words. They come from Paul Celan, "Die Niemandsrose", and express the mourning of 3.11, the date of the 2011 Tōhoku earthquake and tsunami. In these works, an AR rose appears on the top of the Tokyo Tower. In Sekai Camera apprication, touching float poetry words allows the toucher to write a reply (Relational Art).

ni_ka's works are a kind of conceptual art which showed dynamic activity in Smartphone and monitor, but the concept is that come from the movement of Japanese concrete poetry called VOU, ASA.

She also created "monitor poetry". Monitor poetry is used in emoji and decomoji, influenced by Seiichi Niikuni, Katsue Kitasono, Gozo Yoshimasu and Stéphane Mallarmé. In January 2015, her work named "WEB h a l l e l u j a h　「a」－blood／arch(WEB　は　れ　る　や　「あ」－血／アーチ)" translated by Andrew Campana, was uploaded on the web magazine CURA.

References

External links
 Website

Living people
Chuo University alumni
Japanese women artists
Japanese women poets
Year of birth missing (living people)